Baharak is a small town and seat of Baharak District Badakhshan Province in north-eastern Afghanistan. It is roughly 15 kilometers from Jurm, on the Kokcha River. Baharak Girls' School was opened on December 17, 2006, by Munshi Abdul Majeed the Governor of Badakhshan Province, it serves about 3000 girls who attend in three separate shifts during the day.

Climate
Baharak has a humid continental climate (Köppen: Dsb) with warm, dry summers and cold, snowy winters.

References

Populated places in Baharak District